Brotheridge Green Nature Reserve is a nature reserve of the Worcestershire Wildlife Trust, at Brotheridge Green, about  west of Upton-upon-Severn, in Worcestershire, England. It is on a section of a former railway line.

Description
The reserve, area , is a Site of Special Scientific Interest. It is about half a mile of a section of railway line between Malvern and Upton-upon-Severn, part of the Tewkesbury and Malvern Railway. The line closed in 1952.

The eastern part of the site, near the road bridge, is a cutting where soil can remain damp; further west is an embankment, providing a different habitat with well-drained soil. The line is colonised with grassland, scrub and young trees. The site is noted for butterflies: more than 30 species have been recorded, including white-letter hairstreak, small copper and holly blue.

Links and biodiversity
The Trust believes that links between areas of countryside are beneficial for biodiversity; it notes that this reserve is one of several grasslands and one orchard in the area.

References

Nature reserves in Worcestershire
Sites of Special Scientific Interest in Worcestershire
Grasslands of the United Kingdom